Saushkin is a rural locality (a khutor) in Kremenskoye Rural Settlement, Kletsky District, Volgograd Oblast, Russia. The population was 15 as of 2010.

Geography 
Saushkin is located 56 km northeast of Kletskaya (the district's administrative centre) by road. Zimovsky is the nearest rural locality.

References 

Rural localities in Kletsky District